Gulf English School Kuwait (GES) is a private, co-educational, international school that is currently located in the suburb of Salmiya, Kuwait. The school has a selective intake of students aged 4–18. Most teaching programmes are based on the National Curriculum of England.  Year 10 and 11 within exception of fast-track year 9 students undertake programmes of study leading to GCSE and IGCSE. Sixth form students work towards Edexcel AS and A Level examinations.

History

GES opened in 1980 in Salwa and moved to Rumaithiya in 1996, then finally to Salmiya in 2005, next to Laila Gallery and Salmiya Park. The new campus is a smaller campus than the previous campus in Rumaithiya, though it is more modern.

GES and ATIS are sister schools.

Notable alumni
 Shujoun Al-Hajri, Kuwaiti actress
 Hamad Al Ali, Kuwaiti TV Presenter and Media Producer

Top years
2012 - 3 sports awards, school awards
2016 - 4 sports awards, school awards, top Kuwaiti Students.

Awards and sports achievements

Sports
AUK Boys High School Football Tournament:
2012, 2013, 2014, 2016
AUK Girls High School Football Tournament:
2016
Kuwait Private Schools under-15 Boys Football League:
2012
Kuwait Private Schools Girls Primary Uni-hock Tournament:
2016
Kuwait Primary School Handball Tournament:
 2009, 2011
Dubai's Middle-East Schools Swimming Championship:
 2011
Skepls Football Academy Tournament:
 2013
 Boys U-12 uni-hock Private Schools Tournament:
 2010
 Boys U-16 Football Private Schools Tournament:
 2017
 ISSFK Boys Football Tournament:
 2017–18
 ISSFK Girls Primary Swimming Tournament:
 2019

External links
GES website
GSGI Top Schools

References

British international schools in Kuwait
Private schools in Kuwait
1980 establishments in Kuwait
Educational institutions established in 1980